Man-o-Salwa is an Urdu language Pakistani telenovela which was broadcast in 2007 by Hum TV, based on Umera Ahmad's novel of the same name. The telenovela, which features actors Resham, Faisal Qureshi, and Noman Ijaz in the lead roles, is directed by Babar Javed and produced by Momina Duraid.

It was broadcast in India by Zindagi under the title Tere Ishq Mein, premiering on 13 October 2014.

Plot

Zainab is a beautiful girl who is deeply in love with her cousin Sheraz and is also committed to him. But Sheraz witnesses certain events which he misinterprets and hence, believes Zainab to be involved in affairs with other men. Thus, he decides to break the engagement only to be told the truth and pacified and finds a place for himself in the good books of his senior at office. And it is here where Sheraz makes new acquaintances and friends who misguide him by suggesting him to marry a daughter from a wealthy family, in order to ensure luxury, comfort and wealth for himself. And thus, lured by these thoughts Sheraz feels the need to break up his engagement with Zainab. At the same time Sheraz also senses that his senior is thinking of getting him married with her daughter (Sheena) and thus, Sheraz starts devising a plan to get rid of Zainab and also succeeds in creating a bad image of Zainab in the eyes of his parents. Soon later, Sheraz's senior visits his home and proposes him to marry his daughter and Sheraz and his parents readily agree to the proposal, leading his engagement with Zainab to be broken up, which deeply disturbs Zainab. Sheraz also spreads rumours and false stories about Zainab in the neighbourhood and she becomes infamous overnight in her entire locality. And determined, to take revenge, Zainab begins her life afresh.

She leaves home and despite opposition from her family begins working as a model and later as an actress under the nom de plume Parizaad. Parizaad becomes widely popular among the masses but still Zainab remains to be viewed negatively by her family and the society. Her father dies and her family disowns her. But later her mother and her elder sister Zohra and younger sister Ayesha go through a deep turmoil. Zohra's husband leaves her along with 3 children. Her mother, who is deprived of food and electricity, decides to forgive Zainab and stay with her. Zainab even saves Zohra's house.

Much later, Zainab gets an offer for a film, to be produced by a man named, Karam, due to which she is called to Sydney in Australia for a meeting with him. Excited about the project, which appears promising to Zainab, she leaves soon for Australia. At the same time, on the other hand, Sheraz is living an unhappy life with his wife and he couldn't even break up the marriage as he owes a lot of money to his father-in-law which he would have to repay in case of a divorce. In Australia, Zainab, upon meeting and spending time with Karam, begins to develop feelings of affinity for him and also gets to know that he is a huge fan and adorer of her. She finds him to be one of a kind and loves him more because neither does he take advantage of her nor he is bothered about the rumours regarding Parizaad spread in the entire industry. But as the project gets cancelled Zainab returns to Pakistan.

Upon returning to Pakistan, Zainab happens to meet Sheraz once again, after years, and determined to take revenge this time she succeeds in getting him involved in a scandal. Sheraz is put behind the bars and becomes infamous in the society overnight. Upon knowing this Sheraz's wife divorces him and she, along with her father, leaves him to be as he is in the police station. Sheraz pleads many acquaintances to help him but all refuse him and is left with no way out. Following this incident, Zainab retires from modeling and acting and travels to Sydney to meet and to be with Karam.

Meanwhile, in Australia, Karam's mother forces him to marry a lady named Zari, who is much younger to him in age. And until the marriage both remain unaware of the fact that none of them had given their full approval to the marriage. And after getting married, when Karam gets to know the truth and also that his wife loves a man named Jamal, he allows her to break up the marriage and to be with the man of her love. And when Zainab arrives, Karam is once again single and they begin to spend time with each other and slowly develop a feeling of love for each other. But when Karam meets his mother and confesses to her his wish to marry Zainab, she insults and demeans her, forcing Zainab to leave the house. But in her absence, Karam asserts his will and determination to marry Zainab and also claims that his mother and brother have used him just for amassing wealth to fulfill their needs and to uplift their social status and saying this, Karam leaves tormented in search of Zainab. And while looking for her, Karam finds her belongings at various points on a path that leads to his own house. But by the time Karam reaches home Zainab had already committed suicide by jumping from the balcony.

Cast
 Resham as Zainab, Karam's wife
 Faisal Qureshi as Sheraz
 Noman Ijaz as Karam
 Ayesha Khan as Zari, Jamal's wife
 Imran Abbas as Jamal, Zari's Husband
 Juggan Kazim as Sheena
 Fatima Effendi
 Uzma Gillani as Karam's mother
 Ismat Zaidi as Zainab's mother
 Shahzad Reza as Zainab's father
 Sajida Syed as Sheraz's mother
 Rashid Farooqi as Sultan
 Zeba Ali as Ayesha
 Yasir Nawaz as Randhawa
 Tipu Sharif as Sohail

Lux Style Awards
 Best TV Play (Satellite)-Won
 Best TV Director (Satellite)-Babar Javed-Nominated
 Best TV Actress (Satellite)-Resham-Nominated
 Best TV Actor (Satellite)-Noman Ijaz-Nominated

See also 
 Noorpur Ki Rani
 Aashti
 Dil, Diya, Dehleez
 Manay Na Ye Dil

References

2007 telenovelas
2007 Pakistani television series debuts
2007 Pakistani television series endings
Pakistani telenovelas
Urdu-language television shows
Hum TV original programming
Zee Zindagi original programming